Roy F. France (1888-1972) was the American architect who is credited with creating the Miami Beach, Florida skyline.

He was originally based in the Midwest, but relocated to Miami Beach after a 1931 trip to Florida with his wife.  Several of his works are listed on the National Register of Historic Places (NRHP).

Works in the Midwest include:
Lake Shore Apartments, 470-498 Sheridan Rd. Evanston, Illinois, NRHP-listed
Hillcrest Apartment, 1509-1515 Hinman Ave. Evanston, Illinois, NRHP-listed
Oak Park Arms, 408 S. Oak Park Avenue, Oak Park, Illinois
Santa Maria Apartments, 208-232 N. Oak Park Avenue and 719-729 Erie Street,
[Oak Park, Illinois]
One or more works in NRHP-listed Hyde Park-Kenwood Historic District, Chicago, Illinois

In Miami Beach, France "designed dozens of prominent hotels in Art Deco and Post War Modern styles adapted to local conditions. His advice regarding design was, 'Let in the air and sun. That's what people come to Florida for.'"   The Post War Modern style here came to be known as Miami Modern architecture.

Works by Roy France in the Miami Beach include (roughly from south to north):

(*=included in Collins Waterfront Architectural District)

He designed numerous hotels in Miami Beach which were surviving in 2018, while several others had been demolished. Demolished ones included:
Whitman (demolished),
Shoremede (demolished).

A number are contributing buildings in the Collins Waterfront Architectural District, listed on the National Register.

References

American architects
Miami Beach, Florida